Frank Willenborg (born 10 February 1979) is a German football referee who is based in Osnabrück. He referees for SV Gehlenberg of the Lower Saxony Football Association.

Refereeing career
Willenborg, who referees for SV Gehlenberg, has been a DFB official since 2004. In 2007, he was appointed as a 2. Bundesliga referee. Willenborg also officiated the final of the Junior DFB-Pokal on 1 June 2013 between 1. FC Köln U-19 against 1. FC Kaiserslautern U-19. In the summer of 2016, Willenborg was one of four referees promoted to officiate in the Bundesliga.

In November 2011, he was one of the assistant referees that saved the life of fellow referee Babak Rafati from his suicide attempt, before the Bundesliga match between 1. FC Köln and Mainz 05.

He gave a yellow card to a player for taking the ball off the goalkeeper in play and none of the opposition team bothered to chase, they argued amongst themselves instead, so the player who stole the ball took his time and got a yellow for that.

Personal life
Willenborg is a Realschule teacher at "Realschule Damme" and lives with his wife and two children in Osnabrück. He also temporarily worked at the secondary school "Hauptschule Dinklage" as a substitute teacher for German and sport.

References

External links
 Profile at dfb.de 
 Profile at worldfootball.net

1979 births
Living people
German football referees